Well-known inorganic and organometallic compounds and reagents that are named after individuals include:

 Adams's catalyst (proposed to be PtOx)
 Adamsite (NH(C6H4)2AsCl)
 Adkins catalyst (Cu2Cr2O5)
 Attenburrow's Oxide (MnO2)
 Arduengo carbene (class of compounds)
 Baeyer's reagent  (KMnO4(aq))
 Benedict's reagent
 Bobbitt's salt (4-(Acetylamino)-2,2,6,6-tetramethyl-1-oxo-piperidinium tetrafluoroborate)
 Bertrand carbene (class of compounds)
 Brookhart's acid  (H(OEt2)2BArF4)
 Buckminsterfullerene  (C60)
 Burow's solution (Al(CH3CO2)3(aq))
 Calderon catalyst (WCl6/EtAlCl2/EtOH)
 Caro's acid  (H2SO5)
 Chevreul's salt (Cu3(SO3)2 • 2 H2O)
 Chugaev's red salt ([Pt(C(NHMe)2N2H2](CNMe)2]Cl2)
 Chugaev's salt ([Pt(NH3)5Cl]Cl3) 
 Cleve's triammine ([Pt(NH3)3Cl]Cl) 
 Collman's reagent  (Na2Fe(CO)4)
 Collins reagent  (CrO3 / py / CH2Cl2)
 Condy's crystals (KMnO4)
 Corey–Chaykovsky reagent (O=S(CH2)Me2)
 Cornforth reagent  ([pyH]2[Cr2O7])
 Crabtree's catalyst  (Ir(COD)(py)(PCy3)+)
 Creutz–Taube complex  ([(NH3)10Ru2(pyrazine)]5+)
 Etard's reagent  (CrO2Cl2)
 Davy's reagent {(MeS)PS}2S2
 Deacon Catalyst (CuO/CuCl2)
 Dimroth's reagent (B(OAc)2)2O
 Durrant's Salt (K2[Co2(oxalate)4(OH)2]3H2O]
 Fehling's solution ([Cu(C4H4O6)2]4−)
 Fenton's reagent (Fe2+ / H2O2)
 Fetizon's reagent (Ag2CO3 / celite)
 Fischer carbene (class of compounds related to [(CO)5Cr=C(CH3)OCH3]
 Folin–Ciocalteu reagent (H3PMo12O40 / H3PW12O40)
 Furukawa's cyclopropanation reagent (ZnEt2 / CH2I2)
 Frémy's salt (Na2NO(SO3)2)
 Gilman reagents (R2CuLi, class of compounds)
 Glauber's salt (Na2SO4·10H2O)
 Gmelin's salt  (K3Fe(CN)6)
 Gingras reagent (Ph3SnF2.NnBu4)
 Grignard reagents (RMgX, class of compounds)
 Grubbs catalyst  (RuCl2(PCy3)2(CHPh))
 Hauser base (R2NMgBr)
 Hoveyda–Grubbs catalyst  (RuCl2(PCy3)(CH(C6H4)OiPr))
 Jacobsen's catalyst (derivative of Mn(salen)Cl)
 Jones reagent (CrO3 / H2SO4(aq) / Me2CO)
 Jordan's cation ((Cp)2Zr(Me)(THF)+)
 Kagan's reagent (SmI2)
 Karstedt's catalyst (Pt2{(CH2=CH2Si(Me)2)2O}3)
 Kauffmann's reagent ({O=M(THF)2Cl(mu-CH2)}2 M = Mo, W)
 Keinan reagent (SiH2I2)
 Kläui ligand {(C5H5)Co[(CH3O)2PO]3}−
 Knölker complex (Fe(CO)2H(hydroxycyclopentadienyl))
 Knowles' catalyst ([Rh-DIPAMP-COD]BF4)
 Kobayashi's anion (B[3,5-(CF3)2C6H3]4−)
 Koser's reagent (PhI(OTs)OH)
 Lawesson's reagent ([CH3OC6H4PS2]2)
 Lazier catalyst  (Cu2Cr2O5)
 Lemieux-Johnson reagent (NaIO4 / OsO4)
 Lewisite  (ClCH=CHAsCl2)
 Ley-Griffith reagent (RuO4N(C3H7)4)
 Lindlar catalyst (Pd / CaCO3 / PbO)
 Lombardo reagent (CH2Br2 / TiCl4 / Zn)
 Lucas' reagent   (ZnCl2 / HCl(aq))
 Luche reagent (NaBH4 / CeCl3)
 Magnus' green salt (Pt2(NH3)4Cl4)
 Magnus' pink salt (polymorph of Magnus' green salt)
 Marignac's salt   (K2Ta2O3F6)
 Meerwein's reagent [(CH3CH2)3O]BF4
 Meisenheimer complex
 Millon's Base (Hg2N)OH(H2O)x
 Millon's reagent   (Hg/HNO3(aq))
 Mohr's salt (NH4)2Fe(SO4)2·6H2O
 Negishi reagent   (Cp2ZrBu2)
 Nessler's reagent   (K2HgI4)
 Normant reagents (RMgX + CuX)
 Nugent's reagent (TiCp2Cl)
 Nysted reagent (ZnCH2(ZnBr)2.THF)
 Pearlman's catalyst  (proposed to be Pd(OH)2/C)
 Péligot's salt (KCrO3Cl)
 Periana catalyst  (Pt(2,2'-Bipyrimidine)Cl2)
 Petasis reagent   (Cp2TiMe2)
 Peyrone's salt   (cis-PtCl2(NH3)2)
 Piers' borane (HB(C6F5)2)
 Piers' catalyst (RuCl2(PCy3)CHPCy3.BF4)
 Prevost's reagent (Ag(OBz) / I2)
 Raney nickel (hydrogen dissolved in high surface area nickel)
 Reinecke's salt   (NH4[Cr(NCS)4(NH3)2].H2O)
 Reiset's second chloride (trans-PtCl2(NH3)2, his first salt is Peyrone's salt)
 Rice's Bromine Solution (Br2 / NaBr(aq))
 Rieke metals (class of materials)
 Rochelle salt (KNaC4H4O6·4H2O)
 Roussin's black salt (KFe4S3(NO)7)
 Roussin's red salt (K2Fe2S2(NO)4)
 Scheele's green (CuHAsO3)
 Schlosser's base (nBuLi/KOtBu)
 Schrock carbene (class of compounds related to [((CH3)3CCH2)3Ta=CHC(CH3)3]
 Schrock catalyst
 Schrock-Osborn catalyst (CODRh(PPh3)2+)
 Schultze reagent (KClO3 / HNO3)
 Schweinfurter Green (Cu(OAc)2·3Cu(AsO2)2)
 Schwartz's reagent (Cp2Zr(H)Cl)
 Schweizer's reagent ([Cu(NH3)4(H2O)2](OH)2)
 Schwessinger base (P(NP(NMe2)3)3(NtBu))
 Scott-Wilson Reagent (Hg(CN)2/AgNO3/KOH)
 Seignette's salt (KNaC4H4O6·4H2O)
 Seyferth reagent (PhHgCCl3)
 Shilov catalyst (PtCl2 / H2PtCl6)
 Sharpless reagent  (Ti(OiPr)4 / diethyl tartrate / tBuOOH)
 Shvo catalyst ((C5Ph4O)2HRu2H(CO)4)
 Simmons–Smith reagent (ICH2ZnI)
 Sonnenschein's Reagent (H3PMo12O40)
 Speier's catalyst (H2PtCl6)
 Stiles' reagent (Mg(OCO2Me)2)
 Stryker's reagent (Cu6H6(PPh3)6)
 Swart's reagent (SbF3)
 Tebbe's reagent (Cp2TiCl(CH2)AlMe2)
 Tollens' reagent ([Ag(NH3)2]+)
 Trinder reagent (10% FeCl3(aq))
 Turnbull's blue (Fe7(CN)18⋅14H2O)
 Udenfriend reagent
 Ugi's amine (Fe(Cp)(C5H4CH(Me)(NMe2))
 Vauquelin's Salt (Pd analogue of Magnus' green salt, Pd2(NH3)4Cl4)
 Vaska's complex (trans-IrCl(CO)[PPh3]2)
 Vedejs' reagent (Mo(O)(O2)2(py)(OP(NMe2)3))
 Wagner's Reagent (I2 / KI / H2O)
 Wanzlick carbene (class of compounds)
 Well's salt (CsAuCl3)
 White catalyst ((PhS(O)CH2CH2S(O)Ph).Pd(OAc)2)
 Wij's Solution (ICl / acetic acid)
 Wilkinson's catalyst (RhCl(PPh3)3)
 Wolffram's Red Salt [Pt(C2H5NH2)4][Pt(C2H5NH2)4Cl2]Cl4·4H2O
 Woollins' reagent ((PhP(Se)Se)2)
 Zeise's salt (K[PtCl3(C2H4)]·H2O)
 Zerewitinoff Reagent (MeMgI / nBu2O)
 Zhan catalyst (RuCl2(PCy3)(CH(2-SO2NMe2-C6H3)OiPr))
 Ziegler–Natta catalyst
 ZoBell's solution (KCl/K4[Fe(CN)6]/K3[Fe(CN)6])

See also

 List of inorganic reactions
 List of inorganic compounds
 List of organic reactions
 List of organic compounds
 List of alloys
 Inorganic compounds by element

External links

 http://www.chem.wisc.edu/areas/reich/handouts/NameReagents/namedreag-cont.htm
 http://careerchem.com/NAMED/Named-Reagents%28A-F%29.pdf
 http://careerchem.com/NAMED/Named-Reagents%28G-Z%29.pdf

Named inorganic compounds
Inorganic compounds